Cross and Cockade, now called The Great War Aviation Society, is a historical magazine about aviation in World War I. The name Cross and Cockade refers to the black cross and coloured roundel symbols used respectively on German and British World War I aircraft. The magazine was first published in 1970.

References

External links 
 

Aviation magazines
Quarterly magazines published in the United Kingdom
Magazines established in 1970
Military magazines published in the United Kingdom
History magazines published in the United Kingdom